Michèle Striffler (born 23 August 1957 in Mulhouse, Haut-Rhin) is a French politician who served as a Member of the European Parliament (MEP) for the East constituency from 2009 to 2014.

Political career
Striffler was a member of the liberal wing of the Socialist Party, close to Jean-Marie Bockel, but she joined Bockel's Modern Left (LGM). The Modern Left is a member of the presidential majority of Nicolas Sarkozy. Striffler is assistant to the mayor of Mulhouse, Bockel.

In the 2009 European elections, Striffler was the second candidate on the Union for a Popular Movement (UMP) list in the East region, and was elected to the European Parliament, where she sat with the Group of the European People's Party. From 2009 to 2012, she served as vice chair on the Committee on Development in the European Parliament. In addition to her committee assignments, she was part of the Parliament's delegation to the ACP–EU Joint Parliamentary Assembly.

For the 2014 European election, Striffler was third-placed on the UMP's list in the East constituency. Her party won only one seat in the region, so she was not re-elected. In the 2019 elections, she ran again, this time for the Animalist Party.

References

External links
 Institutional webstite (European Parliament)
 Official website
 

1957 births
Living people
Politicians from Mulhouse
Socialist Party (France) politicians
Modern Left politicians
MEPs for East France 2009–2014
21st-century women MEPs for France
Union for a Popular Movement MEPs
Union of Democrats and Independents politicians